Linda Sue Dixon is a song by The Detroit Wheels. In April 1968 it charted worldwide with some success. The song is basically a thinly veiled paean to the illegal hallucinogenic drug LSD, a mind-altering substance which at the time had acquired an iconic status amongst the youth and counterculture movement. The B-side of the single was a song called Tally Ho.

Both tracks are notable for their explicit references, in Linda Sue Dixon to the naming of the drug LSD, and in Tally Ho to explicit sexual references and the use of the word "fuck" - rarely heard in music of the era due to the prevailing obscenity laws, and particularly restrictions on broadcasts.

In 1998, a version of Linda Sue Dixon was released by the Australian band Hoodoo Gurus. It has also been recorded by American Rhythm & Blues artist Eddie Floyd. In 2007, the original version along with the "Tally Ho" B-side was re-released on the Complete Motown Singles Vol. 8: 1968 CD on the Hip-o Select label.

References
The Ryder Stipulates, Metro Times September 15, 2004.
Carson, David A. (2006):Grit, Noise and Revolution: The Birth of Detroit Rock 'n' Roll - University of Michigan Press, . Extract.

External links
Sample of the Eddie Floyd version on emusic.com.
Sample of the original version by The Detroit Wheels on Amazon.com (this link also has a sample of the Tally Ho B-side).

Songs about drugs
1968 songs